The American Workers League was an American nineteenth century workers political organization.

The league was founded in 1853 by 800 German American delegates who attended the inaugural meeting in the Mechanics Hall in Philadelphia. Among their leaders was Joseph Weydemeyer, a longtime friend of Karl Marx. The organization adopted an egalitarian membership policy holding that all workers who live in the United States without distinction of occupation, language, color, or sex can become members. They opposed the Kansas–Nebraska Act because it had the effect of allowing slavery in the lands opening up in the American West.

References

1853 establishments in Pennsylvania
Organizations established in 1853
Political organizations based in the United States
German-American organizations